Lick Creek Conservation Area is a nature preserve in Boone County, Missouri. It is named after Lick Creek, which runs through the west end. In the 20th century, the area was severely degraded by human activists, farming, and cattle grazing. The conservation department purchased the area in 1992. The preserve features a twelve-acre lake and a small pine plantation. Primitive camping is allowed.

See also
Three Creeks Township, Boone County, Missouri
Gans Creek Recreation Area

References

External links
Official site
Area map

Conservation Areas of Missouri
Protected areas of Boone County, Missouri
Landforms of Boone County, Missouri